Alan Guttmacher may refer to the following American physicians:
Alan Frank Guttmacher (1898-1974), obstetrician-gynecologist and activist
Alan Edward Guttmacher (born 1949), pediatrician, geneticist, and research administrator